Tom Snare's World is the first album by Tom Snare.

Track listing
"Waterfalls (Radio Edit)"
"Philosophy (Radio Edit)"
"My Mother Says"
"My Homeworld"
"Electro Choc"
"Love Sensation"
"Lick It"
"Running (I Can't Stop Loving You)"
"Rock On You"
"Fashion Avenue"
"More Than A Surprise"
"No Dreams"
"Philosophy (Remix)"
"My Mother Says (Extended Mix)"
"Waterfalls (Electro Extended Mix)"
"My Mother Says (My Piano Mix)"

Credits
 Xavier Decanter wrote, composed, produced and mixed the album.

Charts

References

2006 albums